Sambou Traoré  (born November 25, 1979 in Paris) is a Malian-French basketball player currently playing for Boulazac Basket Dordogne in the Ligue Nationale de Basketball. He is a member of the Mali national basketball team.

In the professional season, 2008–09, Traore averaged 11.2 points and 4.8 rebounds per game for Boulazac in the French Pro B league. 

Traoré has played for the Mali national basketball team in the FIBA Africa Championship in 2005 and 2009.  The team reached the quarterfinals in each of these appearances.

References

External links
 SAMBOU TRAORE at eurobasket.com

Malian men's basketball players
French men's basketball players
Basketball players from Paris
Living people
1979 births
French people of Malian descent
Limoges CSP players
Olympique Antibes basketball players